The Billboard charts tabulate the relative weekly popularity of songs and albums in the United States and elsewhere.  The results are published in Billboard magazine. Billboard biz, the online extension of the Billboard charts, provides additional weekly charts, as well as year-end charts.  The two most important charts are the Billboard Hot 100 for songs and Billboard 200 for albums, and other charts may be dedicated to a specific genre such as R&B, country, or rock, or they may cover all genres. The charts can be ranked according to sales, streams, or airplay, and for main song charts such as the Hot 100 song chart, all three data are used to compile the charts.  For the Billboard 200 album chart, streams and track sales are included in addition to album sales.

The weekly sales and streams charts are monitored on a Friday-to-Thursday cycle since July 2015; previously it was on a Monday-to-Sunday cycle.  Radio airplay song charts, however, follow the Monday-to-Sunday cycle (previously Wednesday-to-Tuesday). The charts are released each Tuesday with an issue date the following Saturday.

History 
The first chart published by Billboard was "Last Week's Ten Best Sellers Among The Popular Songs", a list of best-selling sheet music, in July 1913. Other early charts listed popular song performances in theatres and recitals in different cities. In 1928, "Popular Numbers Featured by Famous Singers and Leaders" appeared, which added radio performances to in-person performances. On January 4, 1936, Billboard magazine published its first pop chart based on record sales. Titled "Ten Best Records for Week Ending", it listed the 10 top-selling records of three leading record companies as reported by the companies themselves. In March 1937, the "Songs with the Most Radio Plugs" chart debuted with data from a separate company. In October 1938, a review list "The Week's Best Records" was retitled "The Billboard Record Buying Guide" by incorporating airplay and sheet music sales, which would eventually become the first trade survey of record popularity.

In the July 27, 1940, issue, the first "Billboard Music Popularity Chart" was published for week ending July 20, with separate listings covering retail sales, sheet music sales, jukebox song selection and radio play. Among the lists were the 10 songs of the "Best Selling Retail Records", which is the fore-runner of today's pop chart, with "I'll Never Smile Again" by Tommy Dorsey its first number one.  The final accolade of a successful song was a position on the "Honor Roll of Hits", introduced in  March 24, 1945, initially as a 10-song list, later expanded to 30 songs, which ranked the most popular songs by combining record and sheet sales, disk jockey, and jukebox performances as determined by Billboard's weekly nationwide survey. This chart amalgamated different records of the same song by different performers as one, and topping the first chart was "Ac-Cent-Tchu-Ate the Positive".  In 1955, a composite standing chart that combined retail sales, jukebox and disk jockeys play charts but counted individual record separately was created as "The Top 100" chart, with "Love Is a Many-Splendored Thing" by The Four Aces its first No. 1. This chart is the direct predecessor to the current Hot 100 chart.  The jukebox chart ceased publication after the June 17, 1957, issue, the disk jockey chart after July 28, 1958, the best-seller chart after October 13, 1958, and the Honor Roll of Hits after  November 16, 1963. After July 28, 1958, the composite chart the "Top 100" chart was also discontinued; and  the "Hot 100" began the following week on August 4, 1958, listing "Poor Little Fool" by Ricky Nelson as its first No. 1. The Hot 100 currently combines singles sales, radio airplay, digital downloads, and streaming activity (including data from YouTube and other video sites). Many Billboard charts use this basic formula apart from charts dedicated to the three data sources: sales (both physical and digital), airplay and streaming.

Billboard also publishes various music genre charts. "Harlem Hit Parade" was created in 1943 which became "Best-Selling Race Records" in 1948 and "Best-selling Rhythm & Blues Records" in 1949, and then "Soul Singles" in 1969 (currently Hot R&B/Hip-Hop Songs). "Best-selling Folk Records" was published in 1948, and this morphed into "Best-Selling Country & Western Records" in 1949, "Best-Selling C&W Records" in 1956 and "Hot Country Singles" in 1963 (now Hot Country Songs). MOR charts has been published since 1961, variously called "Easy Listening", "Middle-Road Singles" and "Pop-Standard Singles" and now Adult Contemporary. Billboard charts now cover these music genres: rock, pop, country, dance, bluegrass, jazz, classical, R&B, rap, electronic,  Latin, Christian, world and holiday music, and even ringtones for mobile (cell) phones.

An album chart, the "Best Selling Popular Record Albums", was first published on March 24, 1945, with The King Cole Trio its first No. 1. The first chart had 10 albums, before reducing to 5 in the following weeks, and increasing again to 10 in 1948. The album chart was split into 33-8 and 45 rpm lists in 1950 before they recombined in 1954, then divided into mono and stereo classifications in 1959 before they merged into a 150-item pop album chart in 1963. It was eventually expanded into a 200 album list on May 13, 1967. Various genre album charts were also published: Country LP chart in January 1964, R&B chart in 1965, jazz in 1969, Latin in 1973, Gospel 1974, and Rock in 1981. Other charts include Classical albums, Comedy Albums, Holiday Albums, Soundtracks, Independent Albums, Catalog Album and many others besides.

At the end of each year, Billboard tallies the results of all of its charts, and the results are published in a year-end issue and heard on year-end editions of its American Top 40 and American Country Countdown radio broadcasts. The first such annual charts released were for the year 1946, published on the January 4, 1947, issue, although annual listing of songs had been published irregularly some years prior, such as the undifferentiated annual chart based on "Honor Roll of Hits" for 1945. Between 1991 and 2006, the top single/album/artist(s) in each of those charts was/were awarded in the form of the annual Billboard Music Awards, which were held in December until the awards went dormant in 2007. The awards returned in May 2011.

Chart compilation methodology
For many years, a song had to be commercially available as a single to be considered for any of the Billboard charts. At the time, instead of using Nielsen SoundScan or Nielsen Broadcast Data Systems (BDS), Billboard obtained its data from manual reports filled out by radio stations and stores. For different musical genres, which stations and stores are used separates the charts; each musical genre has a core audience or retail group. Each genre's department at Billboard is headed up by a chart manager, who makes these determinations. According to the 50th-anniversary issue of Billboard, prior to the official implementation of SoundScan tracking in November 1991, many radio stations and retail stores removed songs from their manual reports after the associated record labels stopped promoting a particular single. Thus, songs fell quickly after peaking and had shorter chart lives.  In 1990, the country singles chart was the first chart to use SoundScan and BDS. They were followed by the Hot 100 and the R&B chart in 1991. Today, all of the Billboard charts use this technology.

Before September 1995, singles were allowed to chart in the week they first went on sale based on airplay points alone. The policy was changed in September 1995, to only allow a single to debut after a full week of sales on combined sales and airplay points. This allowed several tracks to debut at number one.

In December 1998, the policy was further modified to allow tracks to chart on the basis of airplay alone without a commercial release.  This change was made to reflect the changing realities of the music business. Previous to this, several substantial radio and MTV hits had not appeared on the Billboard chart at all, because many major labels chose not to release them as standalone singles, hoping their unavailability would spur greater album sales. Not offering a popular song to the public as a single was unheard of before the 1970s. The genres that suffered most at the time were those that increasingly impacted pop culture, including new genres such as trip hop and grunge. Among the many pre-1999 songs that had ended up in this Hot 100 limbo were The Cardigans' "Lovefool", Natalie Imbruglia's "Torn" (which peaked at 42), Goo Goo Dolls' "Iris" (which hit number 9), OMC's "How Bizarre", Sugar Ray's "Fly", and No Doubt's "Don't Speak". 

On June 25, 2015, Billboard made changes in its chart requirements. The official street date for all new album releases was moved from Tuesday to Friday in the United States.  For all sales-based charts (ranking both albums and tracks), Billboard and Nielsen changed the chart reporting period to cover the first seven days of an album's release. As a result of the changes, The Billboard 200, top albums sales, genre-based albums, digital songs, genre-based downloads, streaming songs, and genre-focused streaming surveys ran on a Friday-to-Thursday cycle.  Radio Songs, which informs the Hot 100, synced to the Monday-to-Sunday period after formerly covering Wednesday to Tuesday. All other radio charts and genre tallies followed the Monday-to-Sunday cycle. The move was made to coincide with the IFPI's move to have all singles and albums released globally on Fridays.

Incorporation of digital platforms 
Starting on February 12, 2005, Billboard changed its methodology to include paid digital downloads from digital music retailers such as Rhapsody, AmazonMP3, and iTunes. This change also allowed songs to chart with or without the help of radio airplay. This meant that a song did not need radio airplay to be eligible to chart on the Billboard Hot 100. With this policy change, a song could chart based on digital downloads alone.

On July 31, 2007, Billboard changed its methodology for the Hot 100 chart to include digital streams. The digital information at the time was obtained from Yahoo and AOL's streaming platforms. This change was made exclusively to the Billboard Hot 100 chart. The effect of this chart change was minuscule at the time because it was estimated to account for 5% of the chart's total points.

In October 2012, Billboard significantly changed the methodology for their country, rock, Latin, and rap charts, when it incorporated sales of digital downloads and streaming plays into what had been airplay-only charts. Another change was that rather than measuring airplay only from radio stations of the particular genre, the new methodology measures airplay from all radio formats. This methodology was extended to their Christian and gospel charts in late 2013. These methodology changes resulted in higher positions on the genre charts for songs with crossover appeal to other genres and radio formats (especially pop) at the expense of songs that appeal almost exclusively to core fans of the given genre, which was controversial with those devotees.

On February 20, 2013, Billboard announced another change in the methodology for its charts that incorporated YouTube video streaming data into the determination of ranking positions on streaming charts. The incorporation of YouTube streaming data enhanced a formula that includes on-demand audio streaming and online radio streaming. The YouTube video streams that used in this methodology are official video streams, Vevo on YouTube streams, and user-generated clips that use authorized audio. Billboard said this change was made to further reflect the divergent platforms of music consumption in today's world.

Songs

All-genre

Adult/Pop

Christian

Country

Dance/Electronic

Holiday

Internet charts

Jazz

Latin

R&B/Hip-Hop

Rock/Alternative

World music

International charts

Canadian charts

Other international charts

Albums

Video

Discontinued charts 

Notes

Other charts 
In December 2010, Billboard announced a new chart titled Social 50, which ranks the most active artists on the world's leading social networking sites. The Social 50 chart tallies artists' popularity using their weekly additions of friends/fans/followers, along with weekly artist page views and weekly song plays on Myspace, YouTube, Facebook, Twitter and iLike.

In January 2011, Billboard introduced another chart called Uncharted, which lists new and developing artists, who are yet to appear on any major Billboard chart, "...regardless of their country of origin." The ranking is based on the views and fans on social networking websites like Myspace and Facebook. It has since been discontinued.

In May 2014, after the Korea K-Pop Hot 100 chart was discontinued in the U.S., the Billboard K-Town column continued to provide chart information for K-pop artists on all Billboard charts.

The Artist 100 debuted in July 2014.

In June 2019, Billboard launched the Top Songwriters Chart and the Top Producers Chart, based on weekly activity on the Hot 100 and other "Hot" genre charts.

In October 2021, Billboard launched the Hot Trending Songs charts, utilising real-time music-related trends and conversations on Twitter.

See also
Official Singles Chart
List of record charts

Further reading 
 Durkee, Rob. "American Top 40: The Countdown of the Century." Schriner Books, New York City, 1999.
 Battistini, Pete. "American Top 40 with Casey Kasem The 1970s." Authorhouse.com, January 31, 2005.

References

External links
Billboard popular charts (subscription only except Hot 100, Billboard 200 and Artist 100)
Billboard complete artist/chart search (subscription only)
Billboard current boxscore (lists one week only)
Billboard charts archive  (archive of number ones for select charts)

Billboard charts